Nasir Subhani  (Kurdish:)  (14 October 1951 – 17 April 1990 or 19 March 1990) was a Kurdish Sunni scholar from Iranian Kurdistan. He was born in the village of Durisan, near Paveh, Sanandaj in Iran. He was outspoken against the current regime of Iran. He was executed by Iranian authorities on or before 17 April 1990 having been detained earlier.

He has written on various subjects in Kurdish, Arabic and Persian. He is known amongst Kurds by some 1000 cassettes which are recorded using lectures given in various places. He is known for his Quranic interpretations. He established a Quran academy in the town of Paveh in Iran before he was executed by Iran.

Notes

1951 births
1990 deaths
Kurdish scholars
Iranian scholars